Equatorial Guinea–Mexico relations are the diplomatic relations between the Republic of Equatorial Guinea and the United Mexican States. Both nations are members of the Association of Academies of the Spanish Language, Organization of Ibero-American States and the United Nations.

History
Equatorial Guinea and Mexico share a common history in the fact that both nations were once colonized by Spain and part of the Spanish Empire. During the Atlantic slave trade, Spain transported many African slaves from Equatorial Guinea to Mexico where they arrived primarily to the port city of Veracruz. On 16 September 1821, Mexico obtained independence from Spain and on 12 October 1968, Equatorial Guinea obtained its independence from Spain. On the day of Equatorial Guinea's independence, Mexico opened the 1968 Summer Olympics which was hosted in Mexico City.

On 26 September 1975, Equatorial Guinea and Mexico established diplomatic relations. Since the establishment of diplomatic relations, relations between both nations have primarily taken place at international forums such as at the United Nations. In 2005, Equatorial Guinean Foreign Minister Pastor Micha Ondó Bile paid a visit to Mexico. In May 2007, Equatorial Guinean Minister of Information, Culture and Tourism Santiago Nchama paid a visit to Mexico where he held meetings with officials of the Mexican government to explore cooperation schemes in the field of technical training in the media, culture and tourism. As a result of the visit, the negotiations for an Educational and Cultural Cooperation Agreement between both nations were relaunched.

In July 2011, Mexico participated as an observer during the 17th Ordinary African Union Summit held in the Equatorial Guinean capital of Malabo with the Chief of Mission of the Mexican Embassy in Addis Ababa, Ethiopia attending the summit. In November 2016, during the Organisation internationale de la Francophonie summit held in Antananarivo, Madagascar; a bilateral meeting took place between the delegations of Mexico and  Equatorial Guinea which involved the Mexican Director General for Europe, Ambassador Francisco del Río López and Equatorial Guinean Senator Agustín Nza Nfumu. In May 2017, Equatorial Guinean Prime Minister Francisco Pascual Obama Asue attended the Global Platform for Disaster Risk Reduction conference held in Cancún and where he met with Mexican President Enrique Peña Nieto.

In March 2019, an Equatorial Guinean political refugee spoke with Mexican President Andrés Manuel López Obrador to ask for Mexico to intervene against the 40 year dictatorship in Equatorial Guinea by President Teodoro Obiang Nguema Mbasogo.

High-level visits
High-level visits from Equatorial Guinea to Mexico
 Minister of Foreign Affairs Pastor Micha Ondó Bile (2005)
 Minister of Information, Culture and Tourism Santiago Nchama (2007)
 Vice-Minister for Foreign Affairs Alfonso Nsue Mokuy (2015, 2016)
 Prime Minister Francisco Pascual Obama Asue (2017)

Bilateral agreements
Both nations have signed a Memorandum of Understanding on Poultry Farming (2014) and an Agreement of General Cooperation (2014).

Trade
In 2019, trade between Equatorial Guinea and Mexico totaled US$69 million. Equatorial Guinea's main exports to Mexico include: machinery, mineral fuels and sand molds for foundry. Mexico's main exports to Equatorial Guinea include: refrigerators, frozen fish and dehydrated live yeast.

Diplomatic missions
 Equatorial Guinea is accredited to Mexico from its embassy in Washington, D.C., United States.
 Mexico is accredited to Equatorial Guinea from its embassy in Abuja, Nigeria.

See also
 Afro-Mexicans
 Slavery in the Spanish New World colonies

References 

Mexico
Equatorial Guinea